Issyk-Kul dace (Leuciscus bergi) is a species of cyprinid fish from Issyk-Kul Lake, Kyrgyzstan.

References 

Leuciscus
Cyprinid fish of Asia
Fish described in 1925